Gajendra Singh Kalyanwat was a landowner, self-employed businessman and aspiring politician from Dausa district, about 120 km east of Jaipur, in Rajasthan, India. A local politician who started his career with the Bharatiya Janata Party, he switched to Samajwadi Party and contested the 2003 Rajasthan Vidhan Sabha elections as an SP candidate when the BJP denied him an election ticket. He was the district president and Rajasthan state executive member of the SP till 2013, when he switched to the Indian National Congress. On being denied a ticket by the Congress party as well, he finally joined the Aam Aadmi Party.

On 22 April 2015, he died by accidental hanging with a gamucha from a Neem tree in full public view during a political rally at Jantar Mantar, Delhi, organized by the Aam Aadmi Party that runs the state Government of Delhi.

Personal life
The eldest of three brothers, Gajendra himself studied up to class 12. He married early. His eldest child is a daughter studying in class 12; his two other boys are aged 7 and 10.

The family of Gajendra Singh Kalyanwat, owns some 20 acres of land, including a gooseberry orchard and a teak plantation. The land is in Gajendra's father, Bane Singh's, and Gajendra's uncle, Gopal Singh's names, but Gajendra being the eldest among his brothers, looked after the farming. The family had hired six labourers to do the actual farming, as Gajendra disliked manual labour. They also owned two tractors and many heads of cattle. Gajendra was also a successful businessman who had a flourishing trade in selling and tying Rajasthani turbans with a clientele that included celebrities and world leaders.

In 2010, Gajendra had also won the Mr. Desert title, a Rajasthani cultural pageant.

Career
Gajendra was politically ambitious, having unsuccessfully tried twice –- in 2008 and 2013—to fight the assembly elections as a Samajwadi Party candidate.  He had started his career with the Bharatiya Janata Party, but switched to Samajwadi Party and contested the 2003 Rajasthan Vidhan Sabha elections as an SP candidate when the BJP denied him an election ticket. He was the district president and Rajasthan state executive member of the SP till 2013, when he switched to the Indian National Congress. On being denied a ticket by the Congress party as well, he finally joined the Aam Aadmi Party.

He belonged to a socially dominant and political powerful family. He was earlier himself the sarpanch of his village, a position that was later taken up by his uncle.

On 22 April 2015, he attended a political rally at Jantar Mantar, Delhi, organized by the Aam Aadmi Party that runs the state Government of Delhi. He vociferously participated during the entire rally, and climbed up a tree wearing a party headband over his turban and holding a broom (the electoral symbol of AAP) in his hands. While sitting on a branch and shouting political slogans, he attached the gamucha around his neck to another branch. He died of asphyxiation when the branch broke.

References

External links
Jaipur Saffe, Gajendra Singh's business website

People from Dausa district
2015 deaths
Suicides by hanging in India